Sierra Marjory Boggess (born May 20, 1982) is an American theater actress and singer.

She is best known for originating the role of Ariel in The Little Mermaid on Broadway, and for her multiple appearances as Christine Daaé in The Phantom of the Opera. She began by playing the role in the Las Vegas production of Phantom in 2006. In 2010, she reprised the role of Christine Daaé in the original London version of Love Never Dies, which continues the story of Phantom, opposite West End / Broadway actor Ramin Karimloo as the Phantom. She also played the role in the Broadway production of The Phantom of the Opera in 2013. She also originated the role of Rosalie Mullins in School of Rock, 2016.

Early life and education
Sierra Boggess was born and raised in Denver, Colorado with her older sister, Summer, and her younger sister, Allegra. All three sisters are professional musicians. The three were members of the Colorado Children's Chorale. Her parents are Kellun Turner Boggess and Michael Boggess. She attended George Washington High School. In an interview with The Interval, Boggess discussed the influence of drama studies during high school on her early development. She graduated with a Bachelor of Fine Arts from Millikin University in 2004, where she studied voice with Cynthia Douglas.

Career
Boggess began her career in the ensemble and as an understudy for Cosette on the U.S. national tour of Les Misérables. She also played the roles of Binky and Ram Dass in the musical Princesses at Goodspeed Opera House and the 5th Avenue Theatre in Seattle. Her previous work includes West Side Story (Maria), The Pirates of Penzance (Mabel), The Boy Friend and Sweet Charity (Charity).

2006–2013

Around the time she was performing in Les Misérables, Boggess was cast in a Las Vegas production of Andrew Lloyd Webber's The Phantom of the Opera at The Venetian Las Vegas. The production opened on June 24, 2006. Boggess starred in the female leading role of Christine Daaé, co-starring with Anthony Crivello and Brent Barrett alternating in the title role. She stayed with the Las Vegas production for a year.

Boggess was then cast in her Broadway debut, originating the leading role of Ariel in The Little Mermaid. She performed with the show in its pre-Broadway tryout at the Denver Center for the Performing Arts' Ellie Caulkins Opera House, which ran from July 26, 2007, through September 9, 2007. The Broadway production began previews at the Lunt-Fontanne Theatre on November 3, 2007. It was temporarily closed from November 10, 2007, until November 28, 2007, as a result of the 2007 Broadway stagehand strike. Performances resumed the next day following the strike, and the official opening night was pushed from December 6, 2007, to January 10, 2008. Boggess received positive reviews for her performance. She stayed with the show for a year and a half, before playing her final performance as Ariel on May 31, 2009. Boggess was replaced by understudy Chelsea Morgan Stock.

While she was performing in The Little Mermaid, Boggess starred opposite Kristin Chenoweth in the Encores! staged concert of Music in the Air in February 2009.

From February 2010 to March 2011, Boggess starred as Christine Daaé in the sequel to The Phantom of the Opera, Love Never Dies. She also took part in the Rodgers and Hammerstein Prom at the Royal Albert Hall on August 22, 2010, which was screened on August 28. After leaving Love Never Dies and being replaced by Celia Graham, Boggess played Sharon, alongside Tyne Daly, in the Broadway revival of Master Class, beginning on June 14, 2011. The show concluded its limited engagement on September 4, 2011.

Boggess once again played Christine Daaé in the 25th anniversary concert of The Phantom of the Opera at the Royal Albert Hall in London with Love Never Dies co-star Ramin Karimloo as the Phantom at the Royal Albert Hall on October 1 and 2, 2011.

Boggess starred in the Off-Broadway show Love, Loss, and What I Wore from February 29, 2012, through the show's closure on March 25, 2012.

In April 2012, Boggess announced that she dropped out of Rebecca and instead joined the cast of the upcoming musical revue Prince of Broadway which pays tribute to director Harold Prince. However, the project was postponed until 2013. On July 2, 2012, Boggess returned to Les Misérables until January 10, 2013. This time she joined the West End company at the Queen's Theatre and took over the role of Fantine.

On January 21, 2013, Boggess returned to the role of Christine in The Phantom of the Opera for the Broadway production's 25th anniversary and co-starred opposite Hugh Panaro as the Phantom. She performed the role for a limited six-week engagement through March 2, 2013. She was replaced by Christine alternate Samantha Hill.

Following The Phantom of the Opera, Boggess began teaching various musical theater master classes and began to workshop an upcoming musical adaptation of the 1998 film Ever After. However, Boggess was not part of the new musical's world premiere at Paper Mill Playhouse in 2015. She also made her cabaret debut with a solo show titled Awakening at New York's 54 Below. The 54 Below shows were recorded for a live debut solo album Awakening: Live at 54 Below, which was released on December 10, 2013, from Broadway Records.

2014–present 

In January 2014 Boggess played the role of a lesbian in the short film Russian Broadway Shut Down (protesting the Russian government's response to homosexuality in theater). For several years since 2014, Boggess has identified herself with the often repeated motivational moniker; "You are enough. You are so enough. It's unbelievable how enough you are."

On March 20, 2014, it was announced that Boggess would once again rejoin the Broadway company of The Phantom of the Opera as Christine and reunite with her former Little Mermaid co-star Norm Lewis as the Phantom (who made history as the first African-American actor to play the title role in the Broadway cast). They began their runs on May 12, 2014. Boggess concluded her run as Christine on September 6, 2014, and was replaced by Christine alternate Mary Michael Patterson.

After completing her role in Phantom of the Opera with Norm Lewis, Boggess returned to her alma mater Millikin University to perform a benefit concert featuring the Class of 2015 BFA Musical Theatre majors. The concert, based on her Awakening cabaret at 54 Below, was held to raise money for the school's new Theatre & Dance building.

Boggess originated the role of Rebecca Steinberg in the 2015 Broadway production of It Shoulda Been You at the Brooks Atkinson Theatre. The musical—which also starred Boggess' former Master Class co-star Tyne Daly—was directed by David Hyde Pierce. The show began preview performances on March 17, opened on April 14, and closed on August 9, 2015.

Boggess performed the role of school principal Rosalie Mullins in the Andrew Lloyd Webber musical adaptation of School of Rock at the Winter Garden Theatre. The production began previews on November 9, 2015, and opened on December 6.

In February 2016, she reunited with Ramin Karimloo in the Manhattan Concert Productions staging of The Secret Garden in which she sang the role of Lily.

On August 8, 2016, Boggess ended her role as Rosalie Mullins in School Of Rock and was replaced by Jennifer Gambatese. After leaving School of Rock, she was set to portray her role as Christine Daaé in Le Fantôme de l'Opéra, the French production of The Phantom of the Opera. However, the production has been postponed until further notice due to a fire in the Théâtre Mogador, where the show was supposed to be performed. The Théâtre Mogador was only a few blocks away from the Opéra Garnier, where the plot of The Phantom of the Opera takes place.

On November 10, 2016, Boggess reunited with her Music in the Air co-star Kristin Chenoweth during her solo show My Love Letter to Broadway.

On December 5, 2016, it was announced that Boggess would embark on her first Australian concert tour in June 2017, making stops in Sydney, Melbourne, and Brisbane. She began her tour on January 28, 2017, and traveled with her cellist sister Summer Boggess.

Boggess starred in The Age of Innocence as Countess Ellen Olenska at Hartford Stage in Hartford, Connecticut. The show ran from April 5 – May 6, 2018 before the production moved to Princeton, New Jersey's McCarter Theatre for a run from September 7 – October 7, 2018. In early 2019, Boggess starred as Danielle de Barbarac in the Alliance Theatre production of Ever After The Musical. Boggess is expected to reprise her role in Ever After for the show's third regional production at the Ordway Center for the Performing Arts in December 2019.

From July 26–28, 2019, Boggess reunited with her Phantom: The Las Vegas Spectacular co-star Anthony Crivello in the Hollywood Bowl's production of Stephen Sondheim's Into the Woods. Boggess starred as Cinderella alongside Sutton Foster (The Baker's Wife), Skylar Astin (The Baker), Patina Miller (The Witch), Gaten Matarazzo (Jack), Shanice Williams (Little Red Riding Hood), Cheyenne Jackson (Cinderella's Prince/The Wolf), Anthony Crivello (Mysterious Man), and Whoopi Goldberg (The Giant).

From March 13-May 15, 2022, Boggess starred as "Mary" in the New York premiere of Barry Manilow's musical Harmony at the National Yiddish Theatre Folksbiene.

Video blog productions
Boggess has been involved in a number of extended blog series on the web often in association with Broadway.com. These have included the ten-part series titled Daae Days which includes two episodes where Boggess interviews between 15–20 fellow Broadway actresses who have also portrayed the role of Christine Daae in Phantom of the Opera over the many years of its production. Her second vlog Going Bridal went behind the scenes from rehearsals to opening It Shoulda Been You as Rebecca Steinberg. Boggess has also created a video series with her voice coach Mary Setrakian titled Tea and Spinklers also released in 2014.

Personal life 
Boggess' personal website describes her as an "avid yogi, vegetarian, and animal rights activist." She has frequently participated in Broadway Barks, a cat and dog adoption event founded by Bernadette Peters.

Boggess announced her engagement to producer and film director Stefano Da Fre on January 3, 2022.

Theatre credits

Awards and nominations

Recordings
 Princess Disneymania – 2008 "Part of Your World" 
 The Little Mermaid – 2008 Original Broadway Cast Recording
 New York City Christmas – A Benefit album for ASTEP – 2009 "Have yourself a merry little Christmas", "Still, Still, Still/ The first Noel" (feat. Lindsay Mendez)
 Love Never Dies – 2010 Original West End Cast Recording
 The Phantom of the Opera at the Royal Albert Hall – 2011 Live Cast Recording
 A Little Princess – 2011 Recording
 Scott Alan Live – 2012 Live Concert Recording "Always/Goodnight" (feat. Jane Monheit)
 Rodgers & Hammerstein at the Movies – 2012 Soundtrack Album
 Awakening: Live at 54 Below – 2013 Debut Album
 Love on 42nd Street – 2014 "You Caught Me Off Guard" featured on Songs of Daniel and Laura Curtis
 Where The Sky Ends – 2014 "The Devil" – The Songs of Michael Mott
 BroadwayWorld Visits Oz – 2014 "Over the Rainbow"
 It Shoulda Been You – 2015 Original Broadway Cast Recording
 School of Rock: The Musical – 2015 Original Broadway Cast Recording
 ''Together at a Distance (Classic & Contemporary Broadway Duets) - 2021 Album feat. Julian Ovenden

References

External links

 
 
 
  (archive)
 

1982 births
Living people
Actresses from Denver
Millikin University alumni
American musical theatre actresses
American stage actresses
American sopranos
20th-century American actresses
21st-century American actresses
21st-century American women singers